Khooni is a Hindi horror film of Bollywood directed by K.L. Kahan. It was released in 1946 under the banner of Lucky Films.

Plot

Cast
 Raj Rani
 Nawaz
 Hari Mohan
 Baburao Pahelwan
 Navinchandra
 Sabtan

References

External links
 

1946 films
1940s Hindi-language films
Indian horror films
1946 horror films
Indian black-and-white films
Hindi-language horror films